Inside Daisy Clover is a 1965 American drama film based on Gavin Lambert's 1963 novel of the same name, directed by Robert Mulligan and starring Natalie Wood. It follows a tomboy becoming a Hollywood actress and singer.

Plot
In 1936 Santa Monica, Daisy Clover is a tomboy, living with her eccentric mother in a ramshackle trailer. Wishing to become an actress, Daisy submits a recorded song to studio owner Raymond Swan.

Swan puts her under contract for five years and makes arrangements to hide her mother away in a mental institution. Daisy meets and spends time with fellow actor Wade Lewis. Raymond fears that the romance will interrupt Daisy's job. Wade asks Daisy to marry him. She agrees and the ceremony is held at Raymond's house. During the honeymoon, Wade drives off and leaves Daisy in Arizona. When Daisy returns to California, an extremely intoxicated Melora Swan (Raymond's wife) reveals to her that she had an affair with the closet homosexual Wade. Raymond tells Daisy about Wade's orientation, as he'd informed Melora. Raymond and Daisy begin an affair.

Daisy takes her mother out of the care home and spirits her away to a house on the beach. When her mother unexpectedly dies, Daisy suffers a nervous breakdown. Unable to work, she spends her days at home under the care of a private nurse. Becoming impatient with Daisy's long recovery, Raymond tells her she must finish her contract and pending film. After Raymond and the nurse leave the house, Daisy attempts suicide, only to be foiled by constant interruptions.

She ultimately decides to live and leave everything behind. Before leaving, she turns on the oven's gas which causes the house to catch fire and explode. As she walks away on the beach, a passing fisherman asks her what has happened. Daisy replies, “Someone declared war.”

Cast

 Natalie Wood as Daisy Clover
 Christopher Plummer as Raymond Swan (AKA "The Prince of Darkness")
 Robert Redford as Wade Lewis 
 Ruth Gordon as Lucile Clover
 Roddy McDowall as Walter Baines
 Katharine Bard as Melora Swan
 Peter Helm as Milton Hopwood
 Betty Harford as Gloria Clover Goslett
 John Hale as Harry Goslett
 Harold Gould as Cop on Pier
 Ottola Nesmith as Dolores
 Edna Holland as Cynara

Reception
Upon its release, the film was a box office and critical failure. However, the film later gained a cult following when it was shown on television and released on home video.

The New York World-Telegram and The Sun found much to criticize: "[The film] conducts a spectacular travesty of some of Hollywood's preposterously lush nooks without stirring any notable amount of mirth. And it follows Hollywood's predatory smothering of an impulsive, endearing Cinderella without stirring much sentiment or sympathy... Oh! This pathetic innocent is hurt, hurt, hurt but no one cares, cares, cares so long as her picture is finished and rolls in dough, dough, dough... The makers of the picture do not care to make themselves altogether clear but there are hints of the depravity of its Hollywood in fleeting insinuations of dope and homosexuality. The orgies of sex and liquor are much more explicitly presented... [Natalie Wood] seems about to become the movie's biggest dubbing job since Rita Hayworth made her long series of musicals, coming equipped with a different voice for nearly every picture."

At the time of the film's release, homosexuality was a highly taboo subject in American society and, prior to the 1960s, one of the topics the Hollywood Hays Code expressly prohibited. Redford reportedly insisted that his character, gay in the original novel, have some interest in women. Likewise the studio, fearful of the potential controversy, insisted that the film only acknowledge the character's bisexuality through a few bits of dialogue. Despite these limitations, the film is generally recognized for one of the early depictions of a gay or bisexual character in American cinema who is not ashamed of his sexuality and does not commit suicide.

Accolades

Soundtrack
Wood's singing voice was dubbed by session singer Jackie Ward with the exception of the introduction to the song You're Gonna Hear from Me (by Dory Previn and André Previn, who composed the score). The song was later recorded by Connie Francis in English for the album Movie Greats Of the 60s (1966) and one year later in Spanish as Ya te hablarán de mi for the Spanish version of the album, Grandes Éxitos del Cine de los Años 60; by Dionne Warwick for the album The Windows of the World (1967); by Scott Walker on his début solo album Scott (1967); and by Barbra Streisand on The Movie Album (2003).

Wood's vocal recordings, completed for other songs, were unused and unheard on commercial recordings until the Film Score Monthly was released in April 2009.

See also
List of American films of 1965

References

External links

 
 
 
 
 

1965 films
1960s musical drama films
1965 LGBT-related films
1965 romantic drama films
American LGBT-related films
American musical drama films
American romantic drama films
1960s English-language films
Films scored by André Previn
Films about actors
Films about Hollywood, Los Angeles
Films based on British novels
Films directed by Robert Mulligan
Films featuring a Best Supporting Actress Golden Globe-winning performance
Films set in the 1930s
Films set in Los Angeles
LGBT-related musical drama films
Warner Bros. films
LGBT-related romantic drama films
1960s American films